Biglick Township is one of the seventeen townships of Hancock County, Ohio, United States. As of the 2010 census the population was 1,106, up from 955 at the 2000 census.

Geography
Located in the eastern part of the county, it borders the following townships:
Washington Township - north
Loudon Township, Seneca County - northeast corner
Big Spring Township, Seneca County - east
Crawford Township, Wyandot County - southeast corner
Ridge Township, Wyandot County - south
Amanda Township - southwest
Marion Township - west
Cass Township - northwest corner

No municipalities are located in Biglick Township.

Name and history
The township was named after numerous salt licks that had been present near the center of the township. It is the only Biglick Township statewide.

Government
The township is governed by a three-member board of trustees, who are elected in November of odd-numbered years to a four-year term beginning on the following January 1. Two are elected in the year after the presidential election and one is elected in the year before it. There is also an elected township fiscal officer, who serves a four-year term beginning on April 1 of the year after the election, which is held in November of the year before the presidential election. Vacancies in the fiscal officership or on the board of trustees are filled by the remaining trustees.

References

External links

Townships in Hancock County, Ohio
Townships in Ohio